The 1936 International Cross Country Championships was held in Blackpool, England, at The Stadium, Squires Gate on 28 March 1936.  A report on the event was given in the Glasgow Herald.

Complete results, medallists, 
 and the results of British athletes were published.

Medallists

Individual Race Results

Men's (9 mi / 14.5 km)

Team Results

Men's

Participation
An unofficial count yields the participation of 54 athletes from 6 countries.

 (9)
 (9)
 (9)
 (9)
 (9)
 (9)

See also
 1936 in athletics (track and field)

References

International Cross Country Championships
International Cross Country Championships
Cross
International Cross Country Championships
International Cross Country Championships
Sport in Blackpool
1930s in Lancashire